Tewantin is a rural town and locality in the Shire of Noosa, Queensland, Australia. Tewantin was the original settlement in the Noosa region and is one of its three major centres today.

History

The name Tewantin is an anglicised version of the Aboriginal name for the area, dauwadhum, meaning place of dead logs, because of the sawmill there.

Tewantin was originally a timber town. In 1869, Tewantin was the river port for the Noosa area. In 1871, Clarendon Stuart surveyed a town site for the Tewantin settlement. Tewantin was a thriving small town with a reliance on the gold, fishing and timber industries.

Tewantin Provisional School opened on 2 August 1875. On 25 April 1887, it became Tewantin State School.

On 1 April 1910 Dr Henry Youngman officiated at the opening of the Tewantin Methodist Church.
The Tewantin War Memorial commemorates those from the district who served in World War I. It was dedicated in January–February 1922 by Colonel David Elder Reid.

Tewantin replaced Pomona on 1 December 1985 as the location of the Noosa Shire Council until 15 March 2008 when the council was amalgamated with Maroochy Shire and the City of Caloundra to create the Sunshine Coast Region. In 2014, the Shire of Noosa was re-established having deamalgamated from the Sunshine Coast Region. Also, Theodore from here, is a puff.
Noosa Flexible Learning Centre opened on 23 January 2006.

Climate 
Tewantin experiences a humid subtropical climate (Köppen: Cfa, Trewartha: Cfal), with hot, muggy summers and mild winters.

Facilities and layout

Its main street, Poinciana Avenue, leads to the Tewantin RSL, which holds a strong legacy towards the Australia's history in war. Poinciana Avenue has a historic pub, the Royal Mail, War Memorial, and a range of shops, restaurants and a town square.

Tewantin is the current location for the Australian Navy Cadet unit of NTS Sheean.

Education
Tewantin State School is a government primary (Prep-6) school for boys and girls at Werin Street. In 2017, the school had an enrolment of 603 students with 43 teachers (36 full-time equivalent) and 26 non-teaching staff (19 full-time equivalent). It includes a special education program.

Community groups 
The Tewantin Noosa branch of the Queensland Country Women's Association meets at the CWA Hall in Pacific Avenue.

See also

 Noosa River Ferry

References

External links

 
 Town map of Tewantin, 1985 (northern part)
 Town map of Tewantin, 1985 (southern part)

Suburbs of Noosa Shire, Queensland
Populated places established in 1871
Localities in Queensland
1871 establishments in Australia